Stringocephalus is an extinct genus of large brachiopods; between  388.1 to 376.1 million years old they are usually found as fossils in Devonian marine rocks.  Several forms of the genus are known; they may be found in western North America, northern Europe (especially Poland), Asia and the Canning Basin of Western Australia.  Several different types are known; they share a well-developed, curved structure shaped like a beak.  Some of the largest specimens discovered to date have been found in China.

References

External links
Playford, P. E. and Lowry, D. C. 1966. Devonian reef complexes of the Canning Basin, Western Australia. Geological Survey Bulletin 118.
Paleobiology Database
Encyclopædia Britannica
Fossils for sale

Prehistoric brachiopod genera
Terebratulida
Paleozoic life of Manitoba
Paleozoic life of the Northwest Territories